Samson Po'uha (born June 2, 1971) is a Tongan former professional boxer who competed from 1992 to 2002.

Background
Po'uha was born into a Mormon family in Los Angeles, California and was raised in Utah.

Boxing career

Amateur
Highly-touted as an amateur, Po'uha was a National Golden Gloves Super Heavyweight Champion in 1991 and United States (National AAU) amateur Super Heavyweight champion in 1992. During his amateur career, he defeated Larry Donald, Darroll Wilson, and Cuban star Roberto Balado.

Professional
After turning professional in 1992, Po'uha showed good power, but was often out of shape. 

He lost to  former amateur Craig Payne, (then 11-8), in 1994, and never became a major contender.

He lost by technical knockout to then-undefeated Andrew Golota in a fight, where Golota was nearly knocked out by Po'uha, out of desperation he resorted to biting Po'uha on the side of his neck during a clinch. 

Po'uha later lost to a journeyman Jesse Ferguson.

Overall he had a pro career record of 20-5-1 with 18 KOs. He retired in 2003.

Professional boxing record

|-
|align="center" colspan=8|20 Wins (18 knockouts, 2 decisions), 5 Losses (3 knockouts, 2 decisions), 1 Draw 
|-
| align="center" style="border-style: none none solid solid; background: #e3e3e3"|Result
| align="center" style="border-style: none none solid solid; background: #e3e3e3"|Record
| align="center" style="border-style: none none solid solid; background: #e3e3e3"|Opponent
| align="center" style="border-style: none none solid solid; background: #e3e3e3"|Type
| align="center" style="border-style: none none solid solid; background: #e3e3e3"|Round
| align="center" style="border-style: none none solid solid; background: #e3e3e3"|Date
| align="center" style="border-style: none none solid solid; background: #e3e3e3"|Location
| align="center" style="border-style: none none solid solid; background: #e3e3e3"|Notes
|-align=center
|Loss
|
|align=left| Sherman Williams
|MD
|10
|21/04/2002
|align=left| Laughlin, Nevada, U.S.
|align=left|
|-
|Draw
|
|align=left| Frankie Swindell
|PTS
|5
|30/01/2002
|align=left| Miami Beach, Florida, U.S.
|align=left|
|-
|Win
|
|align=left| Louis Monaco
|KO
|8
|05/05/2000
|align=left| Las Vegas, Nevada, U.S.
|align=left|
|-
|Loss
|
|align=left| David Vedder
|PTS
|6
|12/06/1999
|align=left| Saint George, Utah, U.S.
|align=left|
|-
|Loss
|
|align=left| Jesse Ferguson
|TKO
|8
|31/05/1997
|align=left| Atlantic City, New Jersey, U.S.
|align=left|
|-
|Win
|
|align=left| Bert Cooper
|TKO
|4
|22/04/1997
|align=left| Auburn Hills, Michigan, U.S.
|align=left|
|-
|Win
|
|align=left| Frankie Swindell
|SD
|10
|05/04/1997
|align=left| Albuquerque, New Mexico, U.S.
|align=left|
|-
|Win
|
|align=left| Jimmy Haynes
|TKO
|2
|28/01/1997
|align=left| Auburn Hills, Michigan, U.S.
|align=left|
|-
|Win
|
|align=left| Patrick Freeman
|UD
|4
|15/07/1996
|align=left| Laughlin, Nevada, U.S.
|align=left|
|-
|Loss
|
|align=left| Andrew Golota
|TKO
|5
|16/05/1995
|align=left| Atlantic City, New Jersey, U.S.
|align=left|
|-
|Win
|
|align=left| Martin Foster
|TKO
|1
|19/01/1995
|align=left| Auburn Hills, Michigan, U.S.
|align=left|
|-
|Win
|
|align=left| Jeff Lally
|KO
|1
|08/12/1994
|align=left| Las Vegas, Nevada, U.S.
|align=left|
|-
|Win
|
|align=left| John Morton
|KO
|1
|17/11/1994
|align=left| Saint George, Utah, U.S.
|align=left|
|-
|Loss
|
|align=left| Craig Payne
|TKO
|6
|30/06/1994
|align=left| Mesquite, Nevada, U.S.
|align=left|
|-
|Win
|
|align=left| David Graves
|KO
|7
|14/01/1994
|align=left| Saint George, Utah, U.S.
|align=left|
|-
|Win
|
|align=left| Mike Rouse
|TKO
|8
|16/11/1993
|align=left| Bay Saint Louis, Mississippi, U.S.
|align=left|
|-
|Win
|
|align=left| Jason Waller
|TKO
|1
|05/10/1993
|align=left| Las Vegas, Nevada, U.S.
|align=left|
|-
|Win
|
|align=left| Carl McGrew
|TKO
|1
|04/09/1993
|align=left| Las Vegas, Nevada, U.S.
|align=left|
|-
|Win
|
|align=left| Al Shoffner
|TKO
|2
|30/08/1993
|align=left| Kansas City, Missouri, U.S.
|align=left|
|-
|Win
|
|align=left| Eddie Gonzales
|KO
|1
|05/08/1993
|align=left| Las Vegas, Nevada, U.S.
|align=left|
|-
|Win
|
|align=left| Domingo Monroe
|TKO
|2
|15/07/1993
|align=left| Mashantucket, Connecticut, U.S.
|align=left|
|-
|Win
|
|align=left| Mike Acklie
|KO
|1
|26/06/1993
|align=left| Saint George, Utah, U.S.
|align=left|
|-
|Win
|
|align=left| Warren Williams
|TKO
|1
|06/06/1993
|align=left| Las Vegas, Nevada, U.S.
|align=left|
|-
|Win
|
|align=left| Willie Jackson
|TKO
|1
|03/04/1993
|align=left| Las Vegas, Nevada, U.S.
|align=left|
|-
|Win
|
|align=left| Patrick Smith
|TKO
|4
|14/02/1993
|align=left| Las Vegas, Nevada, U.S.
|align=left|
|-
|Win
|
|align=left| Steve Cortez
|KO
|1
|25/11/1992
|align=left| Las Vegas, Nevada, U.S.
|align=left|
|}

References

External links 
 

1972 births
Living people
American male boxers
Tongan male boxers
Heavyweight boxers
National Golden Gloves champions
Winners of the United States Championship for amateur boxers
Boxers from Los Angeles
Boxers from Utah
American people of Tongan descent